This is a list of convention centers named after people. It details the name of the convention center, its location and eponym.

List
Aiwan-e-Iqbal, Lahore, Pakistan, named for Muhammad Iqbal
Anthony Wayne Ballroom at the Grand Wayne Convention Center, Fort Wayne, Indiana, United States, named for Anthony Wayne (American Revolutionary War general)
Auditoria Benito Juarez, Los Mochis, Mexico, named for Benito Juárez (former president of Mexico)
Bandaranaike Memorial International Conference Hall, Colombo, Sri Lanka, named for Solomon Ridgeway Dias Bandaranaike
Bartle Hall Convention Center, Kansas City, Missouri, United States, named for Harold Roe Bartle
Calvin L. Rampton (Salt Palace) Convention Center, Salt Lake City, Utah, United States, named for Cal Rampton (former Utah governor)
Cobo Hall, Detroit, Michigan, United States, named for Albert Cobo (former Detroit mayor)
David Eccles Conference Center, Ogden, Utah, United States, named for David Eccles (businessman)
David L. Lawrence Convention Center, Pittsburgh, Pennsylvania, United States, named for David L. Lawrence
DeVos Place Convention Center, Grand Rapids, Michigan, United States, named for Richard DeVos
Donald E. Stephens Convention Center, Rosemont, Illinois, United States, named for Donald E. Stephens (former Rosemont mayor)
Ernest N. Morial Convention Center, New Orleans, Louisiana, United States, named for Ernest N. Morial
George R. Brown Convention Center, Houston, Texas, United States, named for George R. Brown (entrepreneur)
Hynes Convention Center, Boston, Massachusetts, United States, named for John Hynes
Jacob K. Javits Convention Center, New York City, United States, named for Jacob K. Javits
James H. Rainwater Convention Center, Valdosta, Georgia, United States, named for James H. Rainwater (former Valdosta mayor)
Jinnah Convention Centre, Islamabad, Pakistan, named for Quaid-e-Azam Muhammad Ali Jinnah
Julius Nyerere International Convention Centre, Dar es Salaam, Tanzania. Named after Julius Nyerere
Kenyatta International Conference Centre, Nairobi, Kenya. Named after Jomo Kenyatta.
King Hussein Bin Talal Convention Center, east coast of the Dead Sea in Jordan. Named for Hussein I, former King of Jordan
Lloyd Erskine Sandiford Conference and Cultural Centre, Two Mile Hill, Saint Michael, Barbados, named after Lloyd Erskine Sandiford (former prime minister of Barbados)
Mahatma Mandir, Gandhinagar, Gujarat, India, named after Mahatma Gandhi
McCormick Place, Chicago, Illinois, United States, named for Robert R. McCormick
Michael Fowler Centre, Wellington, New Zealand, named for Sir Michael Fowler (former Wellington mayor)
Moscone Center, San Francisco, California, United States, named for George Moscone
Obi Wali International Conference Center, Port Harcourt, Rivers State, named for senator Obi Wali
Prime F. Osborn III Convention Center, Jacksonville, Florida, United States, named for Prime F. Osborn III (former CSX chairman)
Putra World Trade Centre, Kuala Lumpur, Malaysia, named for Tunku Abdul Rahman (first Prime Minister of Malaysia)
Queen Sirikit National Convention Center, Bangkok, Thailand, named for Sirikit
Sime Darby Convention Centre, Bukit Kiara, Kuala Lumpur, named for William Sime and Henry Darby (founders of Sime Darby
Sultan Ahmad Shah International Convention Centre, Kuantan, Malaysia, named for Ahmad Shah of Pahang (Sultan of Pahang)
Walter E. Washington Convention Center, Washington, D.C., named for former mayor Walter E. Washington
William A. Egan Civic & Convention Center, Anchorage, Alaska, United States, named for William Allen Egan

See also
List of convention and exhibition centers
List of eponyms
List of places named after people

References

Convention Centers Named After People
Convention Centers
Casinos